"Count Magnus" is a ghost story by British writer M. R. James, first published in 1904. It was included in his first collection Ghost Stories of an Antiquary.

Plot  
A traveller in Sweden stumbles upon the history of a mysterious and ominous figure, Count Magnus. 

Mr. Wraxall is an author of travelogues, having previously published one of Brittany. During his travels in Sweden, he comes upon an ancient manor house (herrgård) in Vestergothland and decides to do some research there. He is offered to lodge there but declines and stays at the local village inn. The local church has a mausoleum nearby, built by Count Magnus for himself and his family, de la Gardie. He inquires of his landlord about local traditions surrounding Count Magnus.

The Count is known locally for being a harsh landowner, who severely punished his tenants if they were late with their rent. Houses built too near his lands often burned down. He had also been on the Black Pilgrimage and brought something back. Later, in doing research among the family papers, he discovers an explanation of the Pilgrimage in a book of alchemical tracts, entitled ''. The pilgrimage is to Chorazin and involves a salute to the Prince of the Air. Walking home, he finds himself at the mausoleum and expresses a desire to see Count Magnus. Later on, he meets with the Deacon and queries him about Chorazin, but he is evasive. He presses the landlord of the inn about what Count Magnus brought back from Chorazin and is told a tale about two men who went poaching at night in the Count's lands. One man is found catatonic, and the other is dead and his face has been sucked off his skull. 

The next day, along with the Deacon, he visits the mausoleum. The Count's copper sarcophagus is ornate and contains scenes from his life, as well as a depiction of the Count on its top. One of the scenes shows a man being pursued by a cloaked and hooded thing while a man watches. The lid is secured with three padlocks, one of which is unlocked. Later, on his way back to the mausoleum, his mind wanders and he finds himself chanting. He finds that now two padlocks are unfastened.

The following day, he makes preparation to finish his researches and return to England. He stops at the mausoleum to bid farewell to Count Magnus and again expresses a desire to see him. As he does so, the third padlock detaches and the lid begins to rise. Quickly, he leaves but is unable to lock the mausoleum behind him.

He returns to England safely by canal-boat but feels that among his fellow passengers are two strange figures who fail to show at mealtimes. He lands at Harwich and takes a vehicle to Belchamp St. Paul. Along the way, he sees the two strange figures. He finds lodgings there and spends the next day awaiting the two strange figures. 

The next day, he is found dead in a terrible condition and a jury rules it to be a visitation of God. The house where he died is abandoned and eventually acquired by the narrator, who has it pulled down since nobody will stay there.

Adaptation 
The story was not included in the original 1970s run of A Ghost Story for Christmas for budgetary reasons. Director  Lawrence Gordon Clark wanted to make the story in 1978, later acknowledging; “I wanted to make Count Magnus by M.R. James but they wouldn’t put up the money for it, which I felt was pretty shortsighted considering the success we’d had with the series.” 

The story was eventually adapted over forty years later in 2022 for the same strand as Count Magnus. It was written and directed by Clark’s successor Mark Gatiss.

Influence
Horror podcast The Magnus Archives derived its name from James' "Count Magnus".

References

External links

 
Full text of "Count Magnus"

A Podcast to the Curious: Episode 6 - Count Magnus
Count Magnus - Audio narration on video 

Short stories by M. R. James
Horror short stories
1904 short stories